Marguerite Frances Claverie Oswald Ekdahl (also known as Marguerite Oswald), (July 19, 1907 – January 17, 1981) was the mother of Lee Harvey Oswald.

Early life and family

New Orleans and Dallas
Oswald was born Marguerite Frances Claverie in 1907 to John Claverie, whose family were French Catholics, and Dora Stucke, a German Lutheran, a family of French and German descent. In 1911 her mother died, leaving Oswald, her three sisters, and brothers Charles and John in the care of their streetcar conductor father, who raised them on a salary of $90 per month, though he had the help of housekeepers. Oswald's older sister, Lillian Murret, related that their family was poor but happy. Oswald's brothers, Charles and John, both died of tuberculosis as young men. Oswald attended McDonogh High School, but dropped out in her first year. Shortly before she turned 17, she began working at a New Orleans law firm as a receptionist, falsely claiming on her application that she had graduated high school.
 
In August 1929, while she was still working at the law firm, Oswald married Edward John Pic Jr., a clerk for a stevedoring company. By July 1931, when Oswald was three months pregnant, they had separated, because, according to Pic, of irreconcilable differences, though a salient issue was money, as it would be for Oswald her entire life. Oswald told her family that Pic did not want children, and would not support her. Their son, John Edward Pic, was born on January 17, 1932. Pic supported him until he was 18, though he only saw him occasionally in his first year, and then not again until he was 16. During their separation, Oswald met a friend of Lillian's, a premium collector for Metropolitan Life Insurance Company named Robert Edward Lee Oswald, who was also separated from his wife, when he saw her and infant John coming home from a park. Oswald divorced her husband in 1933, by which time Oswald had as well. Six months after Robert Edward's divorce, he married Oswald in a Lutheran church on July 20. Oswald described her marriage to Robert Edward as "the only happy part" of her life. Their first son, Robert Jr., was born April 7, 1934, and though Robert Sr. wanted to adopt John, Oswald refused this in order to maintain Edward's support payments. On August 19, 1939, little more than a year after the Oswalds bought a house on Alvar Street, and two months before his second son's birth, Robert Lee Oswald died of a heart attack while mowing a lawn on a hot day. On October 18, 1939, the Oswalds' second son, Lee Harvey Oswald, was born at New Orleans' Old French Hospital.

In 1944, Oswald moved her family from New Orleans to Dallas, Texas. She later married Edwin A. Ekdahl that year. They separated in 1946, and formally divorced in 1948. After her second divorce, she became known as Marguerite C. Oswald.

Move to New York City
In August 1952, Oswald and Lee moved to New York City, where they lived for a short time with her son John Pic, a Coast Guard staff sergeant who worked at the Port Security Unit at Ellis Island, and who lived with his 18-year-old wife Marge and their three-month-old son in an apartment at 325 East 92nd Street. Though John and Marge initially bonded with twelve-year-old Lee, Oswald and Lee's stay there, which the young couple understood to be a visit, was turbulent. This was owing to Oswald's conflict with Marge, and her stated desire to move in with them permanently, one which the couple rejected. During the Oswalds' stay, Lee enrolled in the seventh grade at Trinity Evangelical Lutheran School on Watson Avenue. On September 30, after several weeks of inconsistent attendance, Lee enrolled in P.S. 117, a junior high school in the Bronx, where he was teased by classmates for his regional clothes and accent, Around this same time, John noticed that Lee's disposition at home changed. No longer well-behaved, he was hostile to him and their mother, and disrespectful of authority. A few days after an incident in which Marge related that Lee threatened her with a pocket knife, the Oswalds moved out of the Pics' apartment, Lee's rapport with the Pics now permanently broken. Oswald found a one-room basement apartment at 1455 Sheridan Avenue, and found a job at Lerner Shops. However, Lee became truant, preferring to stay home to read and watch television over attending school. Because neither his mother nor school authorities were able to compel his return to school, truancy charges were brought against him, stating that he was "beyond the control of his mother insofar as school attendance is concerned." Lee was sent to Youth House, an institution where children underwent psychiatric observation, where he stayed from April 16 to May 7, 1953. Lee was found to exhibit higher-than-normal intelligence for his age, and showed no signs of neurological impairment or mental illness, having scored 118 on an IQ test. However, Chief Psychiatrist Dr. Renatus Hartogs found:
Lee has to be diagnosed as 'personality pattern disturbance with schizoid features and passive—aggressive tendencies.' Lee has to be seen as an emotionally, quite disturbed youngster who suffers under the impact of really existing emotional isolation and deprivation, lack of affection, absence of family life and rejection by a self involved and conflicted mother.

Hartogs recommended that Lee be placed on probation on condition that he seek help and guidance through a child guidance clinic, and that Oswald seek "psychotherapeutic guidance through contact with a family agency."

Evelyn D. Siegel, a social worker who interviewed both Lee and Oswald at Youth House, while describing "a rather pleasant, appealing quality about this emotionally starved, affectionless youngster which grows as one speaks to him," found that he had detached himself from the world around him because "no one in it ever met any of his needs for love."

Hartogs and Sigel indicated that Oswald gave Lee very little affection, with Siegel concluding that Lee "just felt that his mother never gave a damn for him. He always felt like a burden that she simply just had to tolerate." Furthermore, Oswald did not apparently indicate an awareness of the relationship between her conduct and Lee's psychological problems, with Siegel describing Oswald as a "defensive, rigid, self-involved person who had real difficulty in accepting and relating to people" and who had "little understanding" of Lee's behavior and of the "protective shell he has drawn around himself." Hartogs reported that Oswald did not understand that Lee's withdrawal was a form of "violent but silent protest against his neglect by her and represents his reaction to a complete absence of any real family life."

When Lee returned to school for the 1953 Fall semester, his disciplinary problems continued, and when Oswald failed to cooperate with school authorities, they came consider placing him in a home for boys. This was postponed, perhaps partially because his behavior abruptly improved. Before the New York family court system could address their case, the Oswalds left New York in January 1954, and returned to New Orleans, where Lee finished the ninth grade before he left school to work for a year. In October 1956, he joined the Marines.

Oswald held a variety of positions, including as a legal clerk and telephone operator. One family that had hired her as a baby nurse fired her when they began to suspect she was drugging their infant so he would stop crying at night.

Kennedy assassination 
On the day of the assassination of John F. Kennedy after Lee had publicly been identified in connection with the shooting, Oswald phoned the offices of the Fort Worth Star-Telegram and asked for a ride to Dallas. She was granted this request after revealing her identity, and the reporter to chauffeur her was Bob Schieffer. After Lee was assassinated by Jack Ruby on November 24, 1963, Oswald and Lee's widow Marina asked to go to Parkland Hospital to see his body. In a move that upset Marguerite, Marina opened his eyelids and said, "He cry, he eye wet." Oswald referred to her son's murder as "the tragic event." She also stated to a television camera "my son, even after his death, has done more for his country than any other living human being."

After the assassination, Secret Service agent Jerry Parr was assigned to protect Oswald until the completion of her February 1964 testimony before the Warren Commission.

In its 1978 investigation of the assassination, the House Select Committee on Assassinations found that Marguerite Oswald was acquainted with several men associated with lieutenants in Carlos Marcello's organized crime family, including her brother-in-law Charles "Dutz" Murret.

Later life 
After the Kennedy assassination and subsequent murder of her son, Oswald maintained her son's innocence and claimed that he was an agent of the Central Intelligence Agency. She created a shrine in her home to honor his life and military service, and frequently promoted conspiracy theories regarding the assassination. She wrote a booklet titled Aftermath of an Execution: The Burial and Final Rites of Lee Harvey Oswald, which was never published.

In September 1964, Harold Feldman wrote an article on Oswald, in which he said she was being treated poorly by the media and by the Warren Commission.

In 1968, Oswald sent a telegram to Coretta Scott King, following Martin Luther King's assassination which Coretta regarded as the telegram that touched her the most.

During her later years, she was willing to grant media interviews for compensation. Oswald also charged for her signature and would sell expired licenses and library cards for two hundred dollars each. Sometimes she could be found on Dealey Plaza, selling autographed business cards to tourists for five dollars that stated, "Marguerite Oswald, mother of Lee Harvey Oswald."

She died in 1981 and is buried beside her son Lee at the Shannon Rose Hill Memorial Burial Park in Fort Worth, Texas.

In popular culture 
Oswald was the subject of a 1966 book by Jean Stafford titled A Mother in History, a profile of Marguerite Oswald.

Oswald was portrayed in the 1966 London stage adaptation of The Silence of Lee Harvey Oswald by actress Bessie Love.

Oswald was portrayed by Annabelle Weenick in the 1977 television film The Trial of Lee Harvey Oswald.

Oswald is a character in the 1988 historical fiction novel Libra by Don DeLillo.

In 1991, Oswald was portrayed by actress Ada Lynn in the Oliver Stone film JFK. In 1997, Dutch filmmaker Theo van Gogh released the film Willem Oltmans, De Eenmotorige Mug (Willem Oltmans, the single-engined mosquito). In the film, journalist Willem Oltmans makes claims about his contacts with George de Mohrenschildt and Oswald.

Oswald was portrayed by Mary Pat Gleason in the 2013 film Killing Kennedy, by Jacki Weaver in the film Parkland, and by actress Cherry Jones in the 2016 Hulu television thriller miniseries 11.22.63.

Oswald is featured in the 2013 book by Steven C. Beschloss, The Gunman and his Mother: Lee Harvey Oswald, Marguerite Oswald, and the Making of an Assassin.

Oswald was the subject of a 2015 play, Mama's Boy, by Rob Urbinati, which premiered at Good Theater in Portland, Maine featuring Betsy Aidem as Marguerite, and was published by Samuel French in 2017.

Oswald is a character in Stephen King's 2011 time travel novel 11/22/63.

See also 
 CIA Kennedy assassination conspiracy theory

References

General references

Inline citations

1907 births
1981 deaths
People from New Orleans
Assassination of John F. Kennedy
American conspiracy theorists
American people of French descent
American people of German descent
John F. Kennedy conspiracy theorists